"The Merchant's Tale" is one of Geoffrey Chaucer's Canterbury Tales. In it Chaucer subtly mocks antifeminist literature like that of Theophrastus ("Theofraste"). The tale also shows the influence of Boccaccio (Decameron: 7th day, 9th tale), Deschamps' ,  by Guillaume de Lorris (translated into English by Chaucer), Andreas Capellanus, Statius, and Cato. The tale is found in Persia in the Bahar Danush, in which the husband climbs a date tree instead of a pear tree. It could have arrived in Europe through the One Thousand and One Nights, or perhaps the version in book VI of the Masnavi by Rumi. Though several of the tales are sexually explicit by modern standards, this one is especially so. Larry Benson remarks:

This has particular relevance when considering the parallel between this tale, and the Biblical tale of Adam and Eve. Januarie's friends are named Placebo and Justinus: the former a sycophant, whose name in Latin means 'I will please', and the latter a fairer man ('the just one') with no individual motive.

Summary of the tale

Januarie decides that he wants to marry, predominately for the purpose of lawful recreational sex and to produce an heir, and he consults his two friends, Placebo (meaning 'I shall please'), who while encouraging him offers no personal opinion, and Justinus (meaning 'the just one'), who opposes marriage from his own experience. Januarie, a vain man, hears only the flattery of his sycophantic friend Placebo.

Januarie marries May, a young woman not yet 20 years old, largely out of lust and under the guise of religious acceptability. He chooses her seemingly spontaneously after telling all his friends to go and look for a wife for him. It is unknown why May accepts Januarie; however, it is safe to assume that she did it for social betterment and possibly some kind of inheritance, Januarie being a rich man.

A squire in Januarie's court, called Damyan, falls in love with May and writes a letter to her confessing his desires: the goddess Venus  at the wedding party – meaning she set his heart on fire with love. This could simply be a personification of Damyan falling in love, but since Pluto and Proserpina do physically intervene later, Damyan's love could be seen as literally induced by Venus. May reciprocates his attraction and plots to have sex with him. Januarie creates a beautiful walled garden, reminiscent of the Garden of Eden as well as courtly love poetry, where he and May do "things that were not done in bed". Immediately after this Januarie is struck blind, although it is not explained why, though Chaucer's suggestion is that his vanity, lust and general immorality have rendered him blind in body and in moral judgment. This disability, however, spiritually serves Januarie well. His language and character, formerly lewd and repulsive, becomes beautiful and gentle love poetry, and his love for May could be seen to evolve to more than just lust and desire. On 8 June, Januarie and May enter a garden that he has built for her. Meanwhile, Damyan has sneaked into the garden using a key that he has made from a mould May has given him and waits for May in a pear tree, symbolising, it has been said, the forbidden fruit from Genesis.

May, implying that she is pregnant and craving a pear, requests one from the tree and Januarie, old and blind, and therefore unable to reach, is persuaded to stoop and allow May to climb onto his back herself. In the tree, May is promptly greeted by her young lover Damyan, and they begin to have sex, described by the Merchant in a particularly lewd and bold fashion:  Indeed, the narrator does apologise for this explicit description, addressing the pilgrims saying: 

Two gods are, at this moment, watching the adultery: husband and wife Pluto and Proserpina. They begin a passionate argument about the scene, in which Pluto condemns women's morality. He decides that he will grant Januarie his sight back, but Proserpina will grant May the ability to talk her way out of the situation, saying,  Indeed, Proserpina's promise that  should be able to excuse themselves easily from their treachery can be seen as a distinctly misogynistic comment from the narrator, or perhaps even from Chaucer himself. These presentations of these two characters and their quarrel crystallises much of the tale, namely the argument between man and woman and the religious confusion in the tale, which invokes both the classical gods and the Christian one. Indeed the presence of particular gods has individual relevance when related to this tale: as the classical myth tells, Proserpina, a young and much loved goddess, was stolen and held captive by Pluto, the King of the Underworld, who forced her to marry him.

Januarie regains his sight – via Pluto's intervention – just in time to see his wife and Damyan engaged in intercourse, but May successfully convinces him that his eyesight is deceiving him because it has only just been restored and that she is only "struggling with a man" because she was told this would get Januarie's sight back.

The tale ends rather unexpectedly: the fooled Januarie and May continue to live happily. However, Chaucer does not end the tale entirely happily: a darker suggestion is there, as May tells Januarie that he may be mistaken on many more occasions, indicating that, perhaps, her infidelity will not stop there. Conforming with the wider symbolism in the tale of spring triumphing over winter (May over January), the conclusion supports the unimportance of Damyan (whose name has no seasonal context): he only has two lines of direct speech in the tale, and at the end is utterly forgotten, even by the Merchant.

Fabliau debate
One question that splits critics is whether the Merchant's tale is a fabliau. Typically a description for a tale of carnal lust and frivolous bed-hopping, some would argue that especially the latter half of the tale, where Damyan and May have sex in the tree with the blind Januarie at the foot of the tree, represents fabliau. Derek Pearsall, for example, is in favour of this view. Some critics, such as Maurice Hussey, feel that Chaucer offers a great deal more sophistication and philosophical insight to put this on a level above fabliau.

Sources and variants
Similar tales are Boccaccio's Story of Lydia and Pyrrhus and The Simpleton Husband from One Thousand and One Nights. Book IV of The Masnavi of Rumi contains another pear tree story.

Adaptations
On 27 February 2017, the Guildhall School of Music and Drama premiered a new, full-length operatic adaptation of Chaucer's The Merchant's Tale created by writer Stephen Plaice and composer Julian Philips, entitled The Tale of Januarie. Plaice created his libretto in Middle English not only adapting the original Chaucer text for an operatic setting, but also drawing on other works by Chaucer and creating entirely original Middle English lyrics. Philips and Plaice structured this adaptation across all four seasons of the calendar year, extending Chaucer's original Tale into Autumn thereby following Januarie's tale on beyond the grave. As the first ever opera in Middle English, the work attracted wide interest. The Tale of Januarie is published by Peters Edition.

In Pasolini's film The Canterbury Tales, this story is adapted with Josephine Chaplin as May and Hugh Griffith as Sir January.

Notes

External links

Harvard's interlinear translation. 
Harvard's page 
Modern Translation of the Merchant's Tale and Other Resources at eChaucer 
"The Merchant's Tale" – a plain-English retelling for non-scholars.

The Canterbury Tales
Fiction with unreliable narrators
Infidelity in fiction
Proserpina